The Lord of the Rings is a stage musical with music by A. R. Rahman, Värttinä, and Christopher Nightingale and lyrics and a book by Shaun McKenna and Matthew Warchus, based on the novel of the same name by J. R. R. Tolkien. It is the most prominent of several theatre adaptations of the novel. Set in the world of Middle-earth, the musical tells the tale of a humble hobbit who is asked to play the hero and undertake a treacherous mission to destroy an evil, magic ring without being seduced by its power.

The musical was first performed in Toronto in 2006, before transferring to London's West End in June 2007 with a record £25 million budget. At that time, it was the most expensive stage production ever. The show closed one year later in July 2008, becoming one of the biggest commercial flops in West End history.

Productions

Toronto

The London-based theatre producer Kevin Wallace and his partner, Saul Zaentz, who held the stage and film rights, in association with Toronto theatre owner David Mirvish and concert promoter Michael Cohl, produced a stage musical adaptation. The book and lyrics were written by Shaun McKenna and Matthew Warchus. The music was by A. R. Rahman and Värttinä, collaborating with Christopher Nightingale. The three-and-a-half-hour-long three-act production, with a cast of 65 actors, was mounted in Toronto, Canada, at the Princess of Wales Theatre, at a cost of approximately C$30 million. It was promoted as a spectacle of unusual scale. It starred Brent Carver as Gandalf and Michael Therriault as Gollum, and was directed by Matthew Warchus and choreographed by Peter Darling, with set and costume design by Rob Howell. The production began performances on 4 February 2006, had its opening on 23 March 2006, and its final performance on 3 September 2006. The show played to almost 400,000 people in Toronto. It was nominated for 15 Dora Awards, winning 7, including Outstanding New Musical and awards for direction, design and choreography. It received mixed reviews from the press Richard Corliss of Time Magazine described it as "ingenious" and a "definitive megamusical". Ben Brantley of the New York Times said "Everyone and everything winds up lost," ... "includ(ing) plot, character and the patience of most ordinary theatergoers."

London 

The significantly re-written show, shortened to three hours, began previews at the Theatre Royal, Drury Lane on 9 May 2007, with its official premiere on 19 June 2007. The same creative team as the Toronto production was involved in the London production, with only four cast members reprising their roles from Toronto—James Loye (Frodo), Owen Sharpe (Pippin), Peter Howe (Sam) and Michael Therriault (Gollum). The production featured a cast of 50 actors and reportedly cost £12 million (approximately US$25 million), making it one of the most expensive musicals ever produced in the West End. It was nominated for 7 Whatsonstage Theatregoer's Choice Awards in 2007 and 5 Olivier Awards in 2008, including book and lyrics, lighting (Paul Pyant), sets and costumes (both Rob Howell) and sound. The production took its final bow on 20 July 2008, after 492 performances over a 13-month run. It was one of the biggest commercial flops in West End history. 

The Times called it "a brave, stirring, epic piece of popular theatre" and The Guardian gave the show a four star rating, calling it "a hugely impressive production". The production received many negative reviews from critics; Amol Rajan in The Independent wrote that it had "received a critical mauling throughout most of its run", leading to its closure. In Canada, Variety labelled it "a saga of short people burdened by power jewellery". The Toronto Star dubbed it "Bored of the Rings". Susannah Clapp in The Observer called the stage design "gargantuan" with "a terrific, house-size spider", "black-leather Orcs ... like scarab Richard IIIs" and "long-winded ents ... on stilts". The trouble, she wrote, was that none of these characters "moves events along with any urgency." 

The London original cast recording was released on February 4, 2008, and features 18 musical numbers from the show.

Later productions 

In 2013, Playbill announced that the show would be revived for a world tour in 2015. The first location for the tour would have been in New Zealand but dates and other locations were never announced.

In 2023, WhatsOnStage.com announced that the show would be revived for a 12-week run at the open-air Watermill Theatre, Bangor, Berkshire, under the revised title 'The Lord of the Rings: A Musical Tale.' The production will make use of "large scale puppets".

Synopsis

Act I 

The half-Elven maiden Arwen sings the prologue, urging those to whom she sings to trust their instincts ("Prologue" ('Lasto i lamath')).  In the region of Middle-earth known as the Shire, Bilbo Baggins, an eccentric and wealthy Hobbit, celebrates his eleventyfirst birthday by vanishing from his birthday party, leaving his greatest treasure, a mysterious magic Ring, to his young relative Frodo Baggins ("Springle Ring").  The Ring is greatly desired by the Dark Lord Sauron, who could use it to conquer the world, and must be destroyed in the fires of Mount Doom in Mordor. Frodo and his friends Samwise Gamgee, Merry Brandybuck and Pippin Took set out along the road that leads out of the Shire, where they meet a group of Elves led by Elránien, an original female character who fills the role of Gildor Inglorion from the source material. ("The Road Goes On").  Meanwhile, the corrupt wizard Saruman also desires the Ring ("Saruman").

At the Inn of the Prancing Pony in the village of Bree, Frodo and his friends sing and dance for their fellow guests ("The Cat and the Moon").  With the assistance of the Ranger Strider, the four Hobbits escape pursuit by the Black Riders, servants of Sauron, and safely reach the Ford of Bruinen ("Flight to the Ford").  Awaiting them at the Elven settlement of Rivendell is Arwen, the beloved of Strider, whose true name is Aragorn, heir to the throne of Gondor ("The Song of Hope").  Arwen's father, Lord Elrond, calls a Council of Elves, Men and Dwarves at which it is decided that Frodo will carry the Ring to Mordor.  The Fellowship of the Ring sets out from Rivendell:  Frodo and his three fellow Hobbits, Aragorn, the warrior Boromir, the Elf Legolas, the Dwarf Gimli, and the wizard Gandalf.  Arwen and the people of Rivendell invoke the power of the star Eärendil to protect and guide the Fellowship on its journey ("Star of Eärendil").  In the ancient, ruined Dwarf-mines of Moria, Gandalf confronts a Balrog, a monstrous creature of evil, and falls into the darkness.

Act II 

The Fellowship takes refuge in Lothlórien, the mystical realm of Galadriel, an Elven lady of great power and wisdom ("The Golden Wood", "Lothlórien").  As their journey south continues, Boromir attempts to take the Ring from Frodo; Frodo and Sam flee from the rest of the Fellowship, and Boromir falls in battle.  Gandalf returns in time to intervene at the Siege of the City of Kings, where the Lands of Men are under attack by the forces of Saruman and the Orcs of Mordor ("The Siege of the City of Kings").  Meanwhile, Frodo and Sam are joined on their journey by Gollum, a wretched creature who possessed the Ring for centuries and desires to have it for his own again. As they approach Mordor, Frodo and Sam sing to each other about the power of stories ("Now and for Always").  Gollum is moved by their song, but the evil side of his personality asserts itself and he plans to betray the Hobbits ("Gollum/Sméagol").

Act III 

If Aragorn can defeat the forces of evil and reclaim the kingship of Men, he will receive Arwen's hand in marriage ("The Song of Hope (Duet)"). Meanwhile, Gollum leads Sam and Frodo to the lair of an enormous spider named Shelob so he can take the Ring from Frodo when he is dead, but the hobbits manage to survive and make their way to Mount Doom. Galadriel casts spells to protect the forces of good in the final battle ("Wonder", "The Final Battle"). Frodo and Sam finally reach the Cracks of Doom to destroy the Ring once and for all, but Frodo is consumed by the Ring's power and claims it for himself. Suddenly, Gollum reappears and takes the Ring from Frodo, but he loses his balance and falls into the fire with it. With the Ring's destruction, Sauron is defeated and the dominion of Men begins. Aragorn becomes King and marries Arwen ("City of Kings"), but Frodo, wearied by his quest, decides to leave Middle-earth forever and sail with Bilbo, Gandalf and the Great Elves to the lands of the West ("Epilogue (Farewells)"). After bidding farewell to their friend, Sam, Merry and Pippin return to the Shire ("Finale").

Casts

Musical numbers

 Act I
 "Prologue" ('Lasto i lamath') – Arwen
 "Springle Ring" – Company
 "The Road Goes On" – Frodo, Sam, Pippin, Merry and Company
 "Saruman" – Female Voices
 "The Cat and the Moon" – Frodo, Sam, Pippin, Merry and Company
 "Flight to the Ford" – Glorfindel and Female Voices
 "The Song of Hope" – Arwen
 "Star of Eärendil" – Arwen and Company
 "Lament for Moria" – Gandalf and Gimli

 Act II
 "The Golden Wood" – Company
 "Lothlórien" – Legolas, Galadriel and Company
 "Lothlórien" (Reprise) – Galadriel and Company
 "The Siege of the City of Kings" – Female Voices
 "Now and for Always" – Frodo and Sam
 "Gollum/Sméagol" – Gollum/Sméagol

 Act III
 "The Song of Hope" (Duet) – Aragorn and Arwen
 "Wonder" – Galadriel
 "The Final Battle" – Galadriel
 "City of Kings" – Company
 "Epilogue (Farewells)"
 "Finale" – Company

Awards and nominations

References

External links

  (MusicalTalk podcast episode featuring a discussion about the musical, audience and cast opinions)
  (Images from the Toronto production)
  (Information about the Toronto production)
  (Interview article about the London show)
 Playbill 2014

West End musicals
Middle-earth theatre
Musicals based on novels
A. R. Rahman albums
2006 musicals
2007 musicals
2008 soundtrack albums
Music based on The Lord of the Rings